"Rumba" is a song recorded by Mexican singer Anahí for her sixth studio album Inesperado (2016). It features vocals by Puerto Rican rapper Wisin.

Live performances 
On July 16, 2015, Anahí and Wisin took the stage of Premios Juventud to perform "Rumba" for the first time.

Awards and nominations

Release history

Charts

References

Anahí songs
Wisin songs
2015 singles
Universal Music Latin Entertainment singles
Songs written by Wisin
2015 songs
Capitol Records singles
Songs written by Anahí
Music videos directed by Jessy Terrero